Danita is a given name, meaning "God is my judge". Notable people with the name include:

Danita Angell, American model
Danita Paner (born 1989), Filipino pop-rock singer and actress

References

Hebrew-language given names